General Sir Phineas Riall, KCH (15 December 1775 – 10 November 1850) was the British general who succeeded John Vincent as commanding officer of the Niagara Peninsula in Upper Canada during the War of 1812. In 1816, he was appointed Governor of Grenada.

Military career
Riall was born at Clonmel, Ireland, into a wealthy Protestant landowning family. He was the third son of Phineas Riall (1737–1797) of Heywood, Co. Tipperary, whose father had founded the Riall Bank of Clonmel. His mother, Catherine, was the daughter of Charles Caldwell of Dublin and a sister of Admiral Sir Benjamin Caldwell. He was a cousin and from 1790 the brother-in-law of the traveller, author and collector General Sir George Cockburn of Shanganagh Castle, Co. Dublin.

Riall entered the army as an ensign in 1794 and rose rapidly through purchased commissions. Even though he spent seven years on half pay (i.e. without any regimental or staff appointment), he was a major in the 15th Regiment of Foot in 1805. He sailed with them to the West Indies, and seems to have first seen serious action when he commanded the regiment at the capture of Martinique in 1809. The next year, he commanded a brigade at the capture of Guadeloupe. After this, he returned to England.

Over the next two years, he received promotion to colonel and major general through seniority. He was then posted to Canada, where initially he commanded the Montreal district, then accompanied Lieutenant General Drummond to Upper Canada.

On arrival, Drummond immediately halted all withdrawals and mounted an attack on the American side of the Niagara River. As part of the attack, Riall led a detachment across the river at Lewiston on 19 December 1813 and advanced south. The attack was almost unopposed, as the Americans had stripped the Niagara front of regular soldiers to furnish an ill-fated attack on Montreal. The advance was marked by the burning of almost every village, in reprisal for the American burning of Newark ten days earlier.

On 30 December, Riall again crossed the Niagara River further south, and repeated the deliberate destruction at Buffalo and Black Rock, although here there were a Navy yard and several other legitimate military targets.

On 5 July 1814, Riall commanded the "Right Division" of the British Army in Upper Canada, on the Niagara river. At the Battle of Chippawa, he ordered them to attack Winfield Scott's advancing American brigade. The result was a bloody defeat for the British. Riall's tactics might have been correct had he faced American militia, as he thought, but were disastrous against Scott's well-trained regulars.

On 25 July, Riall's troops once again engaged Scott at the Battle of Lundy's Lane. Riall was severely wounded in the arm early in the battle, and while riding to the rear, was captured by American infantry. While he was a prisoner, a fellow captive (Canadian militia dragoon officer William Hamilton Merritt) described him as "very brave, near sighted, rather short, but stout." He was allowed to sail for England on parole in December.

On 18 February 1816, he was appointed Governor of Grenada, a post he held until 1823. Thereafter, he appears to have seen very little service, although he was knighted in 1833 and eventually became full general on 23 November 1841. He was also successively Colonel of the 74th Regiment of Foot (1835 –1846) and the 15th (Yorkshire East Riding) Regiment of Foot (1846 to his death)

Compensation received by him in 1836 in the name of his wife for slaves freed in Jamaica. https://www.ucl.ac.uk/lbs/claim/view/19278

He died peacefully in Paris in 1850.

References

External links
Biography at the Dictionary of Canadian Biography Online
Portrait of Phineas Riall

|-

|-

1775 births
1850 deaths
British Army generals
East Yorkshire Regiment officers
British Army personnel of the War of 1812
History of Buffalo, New York
People from County Tipperary
War of 1812 prisoners of war held by the United States
Governors of British Grenada
British people of the War of 1812
British military personnel of the War of 1812
Military personnel from County Tipperary